Denis Sokolov may refer to:

 Denis Sokolov (ice hockey) (born 1977), Russian ice hockey defenceman
 Denis Sokolov (sport shooter) (born 1983), Russian rifle shooter